The Yamaha XV920 or Virago 920 was a Yamaha V-twin cruiser motorcycle. Made from 1981 to 1983, it was part of Yamaha's Virago line of cruisers. The 920 was redesigned in 1984 and engine size increased to 981 cc (59.9 cu in) resulting in the renamed XV1000.

See also
 Yamaha XV1000
 Yamaha XV1100

References

Virago 920
Cruiser motorcycles
Motorcycles introduced in 1981